Gary Mohr (born December 15, 1951) is an American politician in the state of Iowa. He was elected to the Iowa House of Representatives in 2016.

References

1951 births
Living people
Politicians from Council Bluffs, Iowa
Republican Party members of the Iowa House of Representatives
Northwest Missouri State University alumni
Iowa State University alumni
21st-century American politicians